Jessica Mary Hand (née Pearce; born 1957) is a British diplomat who was the British Ambassador to Angola from 2018 to 2021. She was appointed as ambassador on 21 July 2017 and succeeded John Dennis in March the next year.

Consular career
Hand joined the Foreign and Commonwealth Office in 1985, beginning as a Desk Officer for India, Sri Lanka, Bhutan and The Maldives. In 1986, she was moved to be Desk Officer for Hungary and Czechoslovakia. Hand was first posted abroad in 1987 to Senegal.

She was recalled in 1990 to be the Head of Economic Sanctions in the UN Department of the FCO and in 1992, the Head of the South Africa Section of the Africa Department. Between 1994 and 1996, Hand was placed on a language training course, becoming proficient in Russian.

In 1996, Hand was appointed the UK Ambassador to Belarus in Minsk. At age 38, she was the then youngest-ever British head of mission. She stayed in the post until 1999, when she was recalled to be the Deputy Head of the Non-Proliferation Department at the FCO.

Hand was posted to Holland in 2002, to work at NATO JFC Brunssum as the UK Political Adviser and two years later was assigned to the Moscow consulate as Consul General and Director of Operations. In 2008, she was posted to Istanbul as Consul General and the Director of Trade and Investment, serving under David Reddaway. Hand stayed there until 2012, when she was recalled to work on various  assignments at the FCO, including the Arms Trade Treaty.

From 2014 until her appointment in July 2017 as UK Ambassador to Angola, Hand worked as the Head of the Arms Export Policy Department.

Hand succeeded John Dennis in March 2018 as the Ambassador to Angola and the non-resident Ambassador to São Tomé and Príncipe. She presented her credentials to Angolan president João Lourenço on 28 June the same year. During her term she supported Lourenço's anti-corruption measures, increased economic ties, and facilitated an official visit by Prince Harry in 2019. She stayed in the post for four years, annoucing she was leaving in November 2021. She was succeeded by Roger Stringer the next month.

Personal life
Pearce married Robert Hand, a retired defence attache of the US Army, and has three step-children.

References

Living people
Ambassadors of the United Kingdom to Belarus
Ambassadors of the United Kingdom to Angola
Alumni of the University of Aberdeen
Year of birth missing (living people)
British women ambassadors